Sven Axel Ariga Rosén (March 10, 1887 – June 22, 1963) was a Swedish gymnast who participated in the 1908 Summer Olympics and in the 1912 Summer Olympics. He was part of the Swedish team that won the gold medal in the gymnastics men's team event in 1908. In the 1912 Summer Olympics he won his second gold medal as member of the Swedish gymnastics team in the Swedish system event.

References

1887 births
1963 deaths
Swedish male artistic gymnasts
Gymnasts at the 1908 Summer Olympics
Gymnasts at the 1912 Summer Olympics
Olympic gymnasts of Sweden
Olympic gold medalists for Sweden
Olympic medalists in gymnastics
Medalists at the 1912 Summer Olympics
Medalists at the 1908 Summer Olympics